Estadio Nueva Condomina, currently known as Estadio Enrique Roca de Murcia for sponsorship reasons, is a multi-use stadium in Murcia, Spain.  Completed in 2006, it is used mostly for football matches and hosts the homes matches of Real Murcia. The stadium has a capacity of 31,179 seats, making it the 16th-largest stadium in Spain and the largest in the Region of Murcia. The Nueva Condomina replaced La Condomina stadium as the home venue of Real Murcia.

The stadium was officially opened on October 11, 2006 with a friendly match between Spain and Argentina. Real Murcia played its first game at this stadium on 26 November 2006, against Real Valladolid.

It was renamed as Estadio Enrique Roca de Murcia in December 2019, after an agreement with the namesake company.

References

External links

Estadios de Espana 

Estadio Nueva Condomina
Estadio Nueva Condomina
Sports venues completed in 2006
Sport in Murcia